is a Japanese actress. She is married to Toshiya Fujita.

Filmography

"Libido" Sei no kigen (1967)
"Affair in the Snow" Juhyo no yoromeki (1968)
"A Tale of Peonies and Lanterns" Botan-dôrô (1968)
"Nihiki no yojimbo" (1968)
"The Blazing Continent" Moeru tairiku (1968)
"Furyo bancho okuri ookami" (1969)
"Fight for the Glory" Eiko eno kurohyo (1969)
"Our Wilderness" Oretachi no kôya (1969)
"Gokudo kyojo tabi" (1970)
"Seijuku" (1971)
"Shadow of Deception" Naikai no wa (1971)
"Confessions Among Actresses" Kokuhakuteki joyûron (1971)
"Lady Snowblood" Shurayukihime (1973)
"Boryoku gai" (1974)
"Seishun no satetsu" (1974)
"Virgin Blues" (1974)
"Panic in High School" Koko dai panikku (1978)
"Motto shinayaka ni, motto shitataka ni" (1979)
"White Love" Howaito rabu (1979)
"Masho no natsu - 'Yotsuya kaidan' yori" (1981)
"School in the Crosshairs" Nerawareta gakuen (1981)
"The Wild Daisy" Nogiku no haka (1981)
"Daburu beddo" (1983)
"Sukanpin walk" (1984)
"F2 grand prix" (1984)
"The Island Closest to Heaven" Tengoku ni ichiban chikai shima (1984)
"April Fish" Shigatsu no sakana (1986)
"Deshima" (1987)
"Hana no Furu Gogo" (1989)
"Gattubî - Bokura wa kono natsu nekutai wo suru" (1990)
"Kaseifu ha mita! 9" (1991)
"Haruka, nosutarujii" (1993)
"Shinonomerô onna no ran" (1994)
"Goodbye for Tomorrow" Ashita (1995)
"Sore ga kotae da!" (1997) TV series
""Yome wa mitsuboshi" (2001) TV series
"My Lover Is a Sniper: The Movie" Koibito wa sunaipâ: Gekijô-ban (2004)
"Gosuto shauto" (2004)
"The Reason" Riyû (2004)
"Hoshi hitotsu no yoru" (2007) TV

External links
 

1944 births
Living people
Japanese actresses